Los lobos is a 2019 Mexican family drama film directed by Samuel Kishi, and written by Kishi, Luis Briones, and Sofía Gómez-Córdova. 

Los lobos is Kishi's second film, which is semi-autobiographical and partially based upon Kishi's own memories. It was nominated for 13 Ariel Awards, and won two: Ariel Award for Best Supporting Actress for Cici Lau, and Best Original Score for Kenji Kishi.

Plot 
The plot tells the story of Lucia (Martha Reyes Arias), who has just immigrated to Albuquerque, New Mexico with her sons Max (Maximiliano Nájar Márquez) and Leo (Leonardo Nájar Márquez), who are 8 and 5, respectively, who spend most of their time in their tiny apartment while their mother works.

It features dialogue in Spanish and English. The plot themes have been likened to those of The Florida Project.

Cast 
 Martha Reyes Arias as Lucía
 Maximiliano Nájar Márquez as Max
 Leonardo Nájar Márquez as Leo
 Cici Lau as señora Chang

Release 
The film premiered at the 24th Busan International Film Festival in October 2019 and went on to show at other festivals including the 70th Berlin International Film Festival.

Reception 
Review aggregator Rotten Tomatoes, reports a 92% of positive reviews, from a total of 12.

Accolades 

|-
| align = "center" rowspan = "14" | 2021 || rowspan = "13" | 63rd Ariel Awards || colspan = "2" | Best Picture ||  || rowspan = "13" | 
|-
| Best Director || Samuel Kishi Leopo || 
|-
| Best Actress || Martha Reyes Arias || 
|-
| Best Supporting Actress || Cici Lau || 
|-
| rowspan = "2" | Best New Actor || Leonardo Nahim Nájar Márquez || 
|-
| Maximiliano Nájar Márquez || 
|-
| Best Original Score || || 
|-
| Best Costume Design || || 
|-
| Best Art Design || || 
|-
| Best Sound || || 
|-
| Best Editing || || 
|-
| Best Cinematography || || 
|-
| Best Original Screenplay || || 
|-
| 27th Forqué Awards || colspan = "2" | Best Latin-American Film ||  || 
|-
| align = "center" | 2022 || 36th Goya Awards || colspan = "2" | Best Ibero-American Film ||  ||  
|}

References

External links
 

2019 films
Mexican drama films
Films set in New Mexico
2019 drama films
Films about immigration to the United States
2010s Spanish-language films
2010s Mexican films